Miloš Bátovský (born 26 May 1979 in Krupina) is a former Slovak race walker. He competed in the 50 kilometres walk event at the 2004, 2008 and 2012 Summer Olympics.

Competition record

References

1979 births
Living people
Sportspeople from Krupina
Slovak male racewalkers
Olympic athletes of Slovakia
Athletes (track and field) at the 2004 Summer Olympics
Athletes (track and field) at the 2008 Summer Olympics
Athletes (track and field) at the 2012 Summer Olympics
World Athletics Championships athletes for Slovakia
Competitors at the 2001 Summer Universiade
Competitors at the 2003 Summer Universiade